James Wyndham John Hughes-Hallett, CMG, SBS (10 September 1949 – 12 October 2019) was a British businessman and investor. He was Chairman of the Swire Group between 2005 and 2015. His sister is the author Lucy Hughes-Hallett. Hughes-Hallett died on 12 October 2019, at the age of 70.

Career

Hughes-Hallett was educated at Eton College and Merton College, Oxford.
 
He began his career as an articled clerk with Dixon Wilson Tubbs & Gillett (1970–73). He worked with the Swire Group (since 1976) and held the following positions.

 Chairman, Swire Pacific Ltd (1999–2005)
 Chairman, John Swire & Sons (Hong Kong) Ltd (1999–2005)
 Chairman, John Swire & Sons Ltd (2005–2015)
 Non-executive director, John Swire & Sons Ltd (2015–2019)

He was also Chairman, Cathay Pacific Ltd (1999–2005) and Director, HSBC Holdings Ltd (2005–2014).

Honours
 FCA
 Companion of the Order of St Michael and St George (CMG)
 Silver Bauhinia Star

Other
 Trustee, Dulwich Picture Gallery (2005–2019)
 Esmée Fairbairn Foundation (Chairman, 2005–2019)
 Governor, SOAS (2005–2010)
 Governor, Courtauld Institute of Art (2008–2019)

References

External links
 Profile at Debretts

1949 births
British businesspeople
2019 deaths
Place of birth missing
HSBC people
Recipients of the Silver Bauhinia Star
Companions of the Order of St Michael and St George
People educated at Eton College
Alumni of Merton College, Oxford